Calansho Desert (Sarīr Kalanshiyū, Calansho Serir) is a desert in eastern Libya in Al Wahat District. It is part of the Sahara and has a hot desert climate (BWh).  It is primarily rocky in the north and center, but forms part of the "Great Sand Sea" to the east and contains the Calanshio Sand Sea to the south. As Sarīr is the only settlement in the Sarīr Kalanshiyū. The Sarir oil field is located in the western Sarīr Kalanshiyū.

It is currently thought that the ancestral Nile flowed through what is now the Calansho Desert during the Miocene.

Climate

Notes and references

External links
 Map showing Calansho Desert as Sarīr Kalanshiyū 

Deserts of Libya
Sahara
Al Wahat District